Rahim Dastneshan (born on 19 August 1960 in Qa'em Shahr) is a retired Iranian football player and now a director and coach. He is the most successful coach in the history of Nassaji Mazandaran Club. Maintaining and uniting the Nassaji Mazandaran Club in 1980s was one of his services to the club, hence he is considered the father of Nassaji.

References 

1950 births
Living people
Iranian football managers
People from Qaem Shahr
F.C. Nassaji Mazandaran managers
Sportspeople from Mazandaran province